Nedrahovice is a municipality and village in Příbram District in the Central Bohemian Region of the Czech Republic. It has about 500 inhabitants.

Administrative parts
Villages of Bor, Kamenice, Nedrahovické Podhájí, Radeč, Rudolec, Trkov and Úklid are administrative parts of Nedrahovice.

References

Villages in Příbram District